Daniil Sergeyevich Denisov (born 21 October 2002) is a Russian football player who plays for FC Spartak Moscow.

Club career
He made his debut in the Russian Football National League for FC Spartak-2 Moscow on 1 August 2020 in a game against FC Chertanovo Moscow, as a starter.

He made his Russian Premier League debut for FC Spartak Moscow on 3 October 2021 in a game against FC Akhmat Grozny.

On 7 February 2022, Denisov extended his contract with Spartak until May 2026. He scored his first goal for the club on 27 August 2022 in a 4–1 victory over FC Fakel Voronezh.

International
Denisov played for Russia Under-17 team at the 2019 UEFA European Under-17 Championship, as Russia lost all three group games and was eliminated.

He was called up to the Russia national football team for the first time in March 2023 for a training camp.

Honours
Spartak Moscow
Russian Cup: 2021–22

Career statistics

References

External links
 
 Profile by Russian Football National League
 

2002 births
Footballers from Saint Petersburg
Living people
Russian footballers
Russia youth international footballers
Russia under-21 international footballers
Association football midfielders
FC Spartak Moscow players
FC Spartak-2 Moscow players
Russian Premier League players
Russian First League players